Genre humain is the twelfth album by experimental French singer Brigitte Fontaine, released in 1995 on the Virgin Records label. The album features a new version of Comme à la radio, the title track from her 1970 album. The song Il se mêle à tout ça is inspired by an autobiographic event of her life.

Track listing

References 

Brigitte Fontaine albums
1995 albums